Welinton Júnior Ferreira dos Santos (born 8 June 1993), simply known as Welinton Júnior, is a Brazilian footballer who plays as a forward for Portimonense SC.

Career
Welinton Júnior played youth-level football for Grêmio and Coritiba before moving to Goiás, where he made his senior debut as a second-half substitute on 30 April 2013 in a Campeonato Goiano game against Aparecidense. He made his national competition debut in the 2013 Copa do Brasil against Fluminense FC on 22 August 2013, deputising for Tartá, who was cup-tied.

In March 2015 he signed a two-year contract with Joinville. Despite playing the majority of games in the 2015 Campeonato Catarinense, he was dropped from the first team after six rounds of the 2015 Campeonato Brasileiro Série A, and loaned to Paysandu until the end of the 2015 Campeonato Brasileiro Série B season. He returned to Joinville having scored 4 goals in 18 games, with a willingness to fight for a place in the team. In June 2016 he was loaned out again, this time to CRB, to play in 2016 Campeonato Brasileiro Série B.

In January 2017, he moved to play for Mirassol in the Campeonato Paulista. At the end of the competition he signed for a second time for Paysandu, on a six-month contract until the end of 2017 Campeonato Brasileiro Série B.

For the 2018 season he signed for another Campeonato Paulista side for the first half of the year, Ferroviária. For the national league season he moved to Brasil de Pelotas to compete in 2018 Campeonato Brasileiro Série B.

He signed for Coritiba in January 2019, on a one-year contract.

Career statistics

References

External links

1993 births
Living people
Brazilian footballers
Brazilian expatriate footballers
Association football forwards
Goiás Esporte Clube players
Joinville Esporte Clube players
Paysandu Sport Club players
Clube de Regatas Brasil players
Mirassol Futebol Clube players
Associação Ferroviária de Esportes players
Grêmio Esportivo Brasil players
Coritiba Foot Ball Club players
C.D. Aves players
Portimonense S.C. players
Shonan Bellmare players
Campeonato Brasileiro Série A players
Campeonato Brasileiro Série B players
Primeira Liga players
J1 League players
Brazilian expatriate sportspeople in Portugal
Brazilian expatriate sportspeople in Japan
Expatriate footballers in Portugal
Expatriate footballers in Japan
Footballers from São Paulo